The Mount Elgon vlei rat (Otomys jacksoni) is a species of rodent in the family Muridae. It is found in Kenya and Uganda. Its natural habitat is subtropical or tropical high-altitude grassland. It is threatened by habitat loss.

References

 Taylor, P. & Maree, S. 2004.  Otomys jacksoni.   2006 IUCN Red List of Threatened Species.   Downloaded on 19 July 2007.

Otomys
Mammals described in 1891
Taxa named by Oldfield Thomas
Taxonomy articles created by Polbot